The Worshipful Company of Security Professionals (WCoSP) is the 108th Livery Company of the City of London. It is a non-profit making organisation providing education and health services to members of the security profession.
 
Formed in 1999 when Steve Neville, OBE, and John Purnell, GM, QPM, DL, registered the Guild of Security Professionals with the City of London Chamberlain's Office. On 18 November 1999, 12 principal founder members met to plan the creation of a working guild. The first meeting with 62 founder members took place on 27 March 2000, with Sir Neil Macfarlane being elected Founder Master and with Sir David Brewer, KG, CMG, CVO,KStJ, JP, and Deputy Philip Willoughby as Sponsors. Progression to a Company without Livery occurred on 6 January 2004 when the petition for recognition as a City Company without Livery was recognised by the Court of Aldermen. On 15 January 2008 the Court of Alderman was petitioned and it declared that the Company became the 108th Livery Company from 19 February 2008. The ranking is by order of precedence, under which guidelines the Company is also classified as a Modern Livery Company.

In 2009 the Security Professionals' Company petitioned the privy council for a royal charter and Queen Elizabeth II approved an Order instructing the Lord Chancellor to affix the great seal to the Worshipful Company's charter, which was granted on 15 February 2010.

More recent developments include the development of an Apprentices scheme which now has around 30 Apprentices and has already had Apprentices successfully graduate and become Freemen of the Company and then Freeman of the City of London. The launch of a Young Members section, with special Membership rates for Members below the ages of 41 and 31, to encourage younger Security Professionals to join a London Livery Company. Such has been the success of the development of the Young Members Group that it progressed to become a full standing committee of the Court at the May 2019 Court meeting and is now the Young Members Committee.

Membership of the Company is drawn from the security industry in its widest sense and includes leading security professionals from the industrial and retail sectors, serving and retired members of the police and armed services, security consultants, academics, heads of security for corporate businesses, investigators, and electronic surveillance companies.

Some of the activities the Company is involved in are listed below. It supports the Worshipful Company of Hackney Carriage Drivers' 'Magical Taxi Run' to Disneyland Paris each year for children with life-threatening illnesses.

The Sheriffs' Award for Bravery
The Sheriffs' Award is a national award for bravery, celebrating heroes or organisations who have contributed to safeguarding our "people, property or our liberty." The award was instituted in 2006 by the Worshipful Company of Security Professionals and is awarded annually by the Sheriffs of the City of London. In 2009 there were 30 nominees to the award from the emergency services, armed forces and members of the public from across the United Kingdom. https://wcosp.org/the-sheriffs-award-for-bravery/. Since the initial award nominations have been received from throughout the United Kingdom. Award recipients have been come from Northern Ireland, Scotland Wales and England reflecting the acts of bravery occurring throughout the United Kingdom.

The Whittington Course
The Whittington Course is a unique partnership that was originally developed with the Business Academy Bexley, now known as the Harris Garrard Academy part of the Harris Federation sponsored by Sir David Brewer, KG, CMG, CVO,KStJ, JP to introduce business management students to the City of London and to encourage them to achieve their school motto that "No goal is beyond our reach". https://wcosp.org/the-whittington-course/.

Register of Chartered Security Professionals
Chartered Security Professionals(CSyP)

The Worshipful Company of Security Professionals were awarded the exclusive right to establish a Register of Chartered Security Professionals under the terms of the Royal Charter granted by the Privy Council on 15 February 2010. https://www.charteredsecurityprofessional.org/ The Company started work to establish a Chartered Security Professionals(CSyP) scheme in June 2010, and the first ten Chartered Security Professionals were admitted in June 2011. The scheme is established as part of the company's own Royal Charter and managed by the Chartered Security Professionals Registration Authority, a Committee of the Court, with The Security Institute being appointed as Administrator for the Register. https://wcosp.org/chartered-security-professionals/. The Register of Chartered Security Professionals won the 2012 "Contribution to Standards in the Security Sector" at the annual Security Excellence Awards in 2012.

Security Benevolent Fund
One of the Company's major projects, and part of the Charitable Trust, the Security Benevolent Fund (formerly Hear4U), provides assistance, such as counselling, to security professionals in order to ensure their ability to return to work after a mental or physical injury.

Details of the application procedure for members of the Security Profession who are in need of such assistance can be obtained from the Clerk. or from the web site https://wcosp.org/security-benevolent-fund/

Past Masters
The Master of the Company serves for one year. The Master's year starts at the Installation Court which is normally held in June.

Company Chaplain and Church

RMP Provost Marshal (Army) Sword
The RMP Provost Marshal (Army) Sword is presented annually at the Annual Dinner in October to the individual who, in the eyes of the Master, has done most to promote and support the work of the Company (outside of the Master and Clerk).

The Worshipful Company of Security Professionals Charitable Trust

The Worshipful Company of Security Professionals Charitable Trust was formed as a Charity on 21 March 2001 and is registered with the Charity Commission under number 1088658. It is a charitable organisation providing education and health services to members of the security profession. It is managed by a board of twelve trustees all of whom are members of the Company.https://wcosp.org/about-the-charitable-trust-trustees/
 
Details of the application procedure for members of the Security Profession who are in need of such assistance can be obtained from the Clerk.

The first Chair of the Board of Trustees was Richard Monk. The current Chair of the Board of Trustees is Claire Palmer.

Chairs of the Charitable Trust

Coat of arms

Badge: A portcullis chained Or within an annulet the outer edge potenty Azure.

References

External links
Worshipful Company of Security Professionals website
Security Benevolent Fund Information Page

Security Professionals
Security organizations
1999 establishments in England